The qualification process for the 2004 AFC Asian Cup football competition began in March 2003. Out of the 45 AFC members, only Cambodia and the Philippines failed to enter for the tournament. Both China, the hosts and Japan, the reigning champions automatically qualified for the finals. The lowest ranked 20 teams were placed in 6 preliminary qualifying groups of 3 and one group of 2, with the group winners joining the remaining 21 teams in 7 groups of 4. The top two of each of these groups qualified for the finals in China.

Preliminary round

Group A

All matches played in Malé, Maldives

Group B

All matches played in Colombo, Sri Lanka

Group C

All matches played in Kathmandu, Nepal

Group D

All matches played in Hong Kong

Group E

All matches played in Singapore

Group F

All matches played in Thimphu, Bhutan

Group G

Qualifying round

Group A

Played in Tashkent, Uzbekistan.

Played in Bangkok, Thailand.

Group B

NB: All Palestine's home matches played away.

Group C

Played in Jeddah, Saudi Arabia.

Group D

1 The match was originally scheduled to be held on September 27, 2003, but was postponed to the following week as the North Korean team failed to arrive in Lebanon due to a traffic accident in Pyongyang.

2 The match was abandoned in the 60th minute with Iran leading 1-0 after North Korea walked off when Iranian fans threw firecrackers on the pitch and refused to continue. The match was awarded 3–0 to Iran, but Iran were also ordered to play their next home match in an official AFC or FIFA competition behind closed doors.

3 The match was not played as North Korean immigration officials did not issue the Jordanian team visas, meaning they were refused entry into the country. The match was awarded 3–0 to Jordan, while North Korea were banned from AFC competitions for a year and from qualifying for the 2007 Asian Cup.

Group E

Played in Incheon, Korea Republic.

Played in Muscat, Oman.

Group F

Played in Kuala Lumpur, Malaysia.

Played in Manama, Bahrain.

Group G

NB: All of Sri Lanka's home matches were played away.

1 Syria failed to show up for the match. The match was awarded 3–0 to Turkmenistan.

Qualified teams 

Notes:
1 Bold indicates champion for that year
2 Italic indicates host

References

External links
 Qualifying Round Results
 RSSSF details

Q
Qual
AFC Asian Cup qualification